That Sikhottabong, also known as Sikhottabong Stupa is a Buddhist temple in Thakhek, Khammouane Province, Laos. It is contemporary to That Inhang in Savannakhet and That Phanom, built in Thailand under the Sikhottabong Empire. The bones of Buddha are said to be consecrated in these temples. King Nanthasene built the stupa for King Soummitham.

The temple is on the bank of the Mekong River. The festival held at this location is during the third month of the lunar calendar.

Architecture
That Sikhottabong was refurbished in the 16th century during the reign by King Setthathirath.

The pinnacle appears in the shape of a banana flower.

References

Buddhist temples in Laos
Buildings and structures in Khammouane province